Dramatic Lyrics is a collection of English poems by Robert Browning, first published in 1842 as the third volume in a series of self-published books entitled Bells and Pomegranates. It is most famous as the first appearance of Browning's poem The Pied Piper of Hamelin, but also contains several of the poet's other best-known pieces, including My Last Duchess, Soliloquy of the Spanish Cloister, Porphyria's Lover, and Johannes Agricola in Meditation.

Contents 
Many of the original titles given by Browning to the poems in this collection, as with its "follow-up" collection Dramatic Romances and Lyrics, are different from the ones he later gave them in various editions of his collected works. Since this book was originally self-published in a very small edition, these poems are now always referred to by their later titles.

External links
Complete combined text of Dramatic Lyrics and Dramatic Romances And Lyrics

1842 poems
English poetry collections
Dramatic Lyrics